Mușătești is a commune in Argeș County, Muntenia, Romania. It is composed of nine villages: Bolovănești, Costești-Vâlsan, Mușătești, Prosia, Robaia, Stroești, Valea Faurului, Valea Muscelului and Vâlsănești.

Natives
 Constantin Dobrescu-Argeș

References

Communes in Argeș County
Localities in Muntenia